The Abyar concentration camp was an Italian concentration camp established in Abyar in the Italian colony of Libya during the Pacification of Libya that occurred from 1928 to 1932. The camp is recorded as having a population of 3,123 people.

The conditions of the prisoners were considered "normal" by the Red Cross in 1932.

See also
 Italian concentration camps
 Italian concentration camps in Libya
 Italian Libya
 Pacification of Libya

References

Italian Libya
Italian concentration camps